Mowad is a town and a municipal council in Nagpur district of Maharashtra, India. The town is located on the Wardha River.

Demographics
, Mowad had a population of 8777. Males constitute 51% of the population and females 49%. Mowad has an average literacy rate of 74%, higher than the national average of 59.5%. The literacy rate is 79% for males and 68% for female. 12% of the population is under 6 years of age.

Flooding
The Wardha River has flooded four times since 1950, in 1959, 1962, 1979 and 1991. The floods of 1962 and 1991 were the worst, causing heavy loss of life, property, crops and infrastructure. After the devastating flood of July 1991, all the houses in Mowad were shifted to safer sites. It is now a much more well planned town.

References

Cities and towns in Nagpur district